MicroBilt Corporation is a credit reporting company and alternative credit data provider. Since its founding in 1978, it has grown by acquisition to challenge its larger rivals. Its PRBC consumer credit subsidiary offers consumers the ability to self-report on the bill paying habits as a means of positively impacting their credit score. MicroBilt’s other subsidiaries focus on business credit and services to sub-prime lenders. Many of the company's products are designed to help businesses accurately assess risk on consumers who otherwise have thin traditional credit files. In doing so, credit can be extended to consumers where it couldn't before opening a new customer base to a company and new opportunities to a consumer.

Products
MicroBilt offers a wide range of data products and services across the lending cycle from originations and underwriting through collections and debt recovery. Their products are available as APIs and through custom web portals. Among the company’s best-known products are:
 PRBC Consumer Report & Credit Builder – A consumer lending platform that leverages alternative credit data and allows consumers to contribute their own bill paying information to help improve their score.
 iPredict Advantage – An automated decisioning platform that leverages traditional and alternative credit data to assess consumer risk during lending assessments.
 Risk Verification Database (‘rVd’) – A prescreening product used to verify consumer identity and banking information in advance of lending and other business transactions.
 Instant Bank Verification (‘IBV’) – A real-time consumer financial data aggregator used to assess a consumer’s ability to repay a loan.
 Bank Account Verify Advantage (‘BAV’) – Helps lenders reduce underwriting risk by leveraging a consumer’s reported banking and loan history together to more precisely identify qualified borrowers and better predict loan payment default and was developed through current customers interviews and competitor products.
 ComplyTraq – A platform used to verify a company’s compliance with federal and state lending regulations including FCRA compliance as well as the proper management and handling of consumer credit information.

Acquisitions
Bloomberg's Company overview of MicroBilt, based on data independently collected by Standard & Poor's, lists the following acquisitions and incorporations:
 2002 – MergTech assets
 2004 – incorporated MicroBilt Merchant Services and MicroBilt Financial Services
 2005 – Profit Systems Software, Credit Data Systems Inc, Eclectic Data Systems Inc.
 2005 – incorporated ComplyTraq LLC incorporated 
 2008 – acquired PRBC
 2010 – incorporated MicroBilt UK Ltd
 2010 – acquired CL Verify ("CLV"), formerly DP Bureau, a leading supplier of credit-related information to short term lenders

MicroBilt Merchant Services
The merchant services provided by MicroBilt Merchant Services are accredited by Visa. This subsidiary also supports remote deposit.

MicroBilt Financial Services
Incorporated in 2004, MicroBilt Financial Services acquired several companies in 1994, 1995 and 1996, and used the name MicroBilt Financial Services Division on an interim basis. Some of their software products were internally developed and others were purchased.

Connect 

Incorporated in 2002 as Pay Rent, Build Credit, PRBC's Unique selling proposition is letting individuals detail their credit worthiness using verifiable data that is not used by the other major credit reporting agencies. Initial success factors included that individuals could self-register, and recognition by Fannie Mae, Freddie Mac, and Citimortgage.

MicroBilt, which acquired PRBC in 2008, has continued to develop it, and released a major line extension in 2012. To the public at large, PRBC is MicroBilt's most visible offering. A year after the 2008 acquisition, some attention was attained with their “Personal info we’ve got to protect, because you know we don't want identify theft” rap.  In 2020, the business unit was renamed Connect.

CL Verify
CL Verify, which provides identity verification and payday loan history reporting,  was acquired in 2010 from DP Bureau They compete with Teletrack, which is known for its consumer credit database used by sub-prime lenders and payday lenders. Somewhat prior to this acquisition, CL Verify had launched a Skip tracing
service.

Books using MicroBilt data
Several recent books have used data from MicroBilt for research.
 Understanding Business Valuation: A Practical Guide to Valuing Small ...
 How to Sell a Business for the Most Money, Third Edition
 Valuing Professional Practices and Licenses – Pages 7–57

Corporate Performance
As a holding company, MicroBilt Corporation began to attract significant earnings coverage by 1987. The NY Times, in reporting on the limited use of on-time rental-payments by other major Credit Reporting Agencies, mentions that "MicroBilt... provides services including alternative credit reporting" and how "MicroBilt's data is used to generate FICO Expansion Scores, which are used for consumers who don't qualify for a traditional FICO score."

Sponsorship
MicroBilt began sponsoring a sports team in 2014.

See also
 Credit score in the United States
 FICO

References

External links
Official Website
Credit Repair Services
How To Improve Credit Score

Credit scoring
Merchant_services
American companies established in 1978
Financial services companies established in 1978
Financial services companies of the United States